List of breweries in Washington may refer to:

 List of breweries in Washington (state)
 List of breweries in Washington, D.C.